Mogrenda is a village in the municipality of Stad in Vestland county, Norway. The village is located at the western end of the lake Hornindalsvatnet along the river Eidselva.

The European route E39 highway and the Norwegian National Road 15 run concurrently through Mogrenda. These road connections link Mogrenda to Nordfjordeid to the west, Volda to the north, Otta to the east, and Sandane to the south.

References

Villages in Vestland
Stad, Norway